Picea koyamae (Koyama's spruce; Japanese: ヤツガタケトウヒ or やつがたけとうひ yatsugatake-touhi) is a rare spruce, endemic to the Akaishi Mountains and Yatsugatake Mountains in central Honshu, Japan. Trees that are lost to typhoons are normally replaced with other faster-growing species and the International Union for Conservation of Nature has rated the tree as "critically endangered". Some trees are in cultivation as an ornamental tree.

Description
It is a monoecious evergreen tree growing to 25 m tall, with a trunk diameter of up to 1 m. The shoots are orange-brown, with scattered pubescence. The leaves are needle-like, 8–16 mm long, rhombic in cross-section, dark bluish-green with conspicuous stomatal lines. The cones are cylindric-conic, 4–9 cm long and 2 cm broad, maturing pale brown 5–7 months after pollination, and have stiff, smoothly rounded scales 6–18 mm long and 6–12 mm wide. Pollination takes place in late spring.

Distribution
Koyama's spruce is native to the Akaishi Mountains and Yatsugatake Mountains, or Nagano and Yamanashi Prefectures in central Honshū, Japan, where it grows at 1500–2000 m altitude. It is found growing in groups of 10-20, with a total population of only about 250 mature trees. The main cause of decline is the loss of natural regeneration after typhoons, with windblown trees being replaced by the planting of other faster-growing commercially valuable species. Other threats include wildfires, landslides and changes in temperature and precipitation associated with climate change.

The tree is named after the Japanese botanist Mitsua Koyama. The name was first published as "koyamai", but this is an orthographical error to be corrected under the provisions of ICBN Article 60.

It is occasionally planted as an ornamental tree. The wood is similar to that of other spruces, but the species is too rare to be of economic value.

References

koyamae
Endemic flora of Japan
Trees of Japan
Critically endangered flora of Asia